Frank Knight (1885–1972) was an American economist.

Frank Knight may also refer to:

 Frank Knight (arborist) (1908–2012), American arborist
 Frank Knight (artist) (born 1941), Australian wildlife artist and ornithologist
 Frank Knight (writer) (1905–1998), British author of fiction and non-fiction
 Frank Knight (Canadian football), Canadian football player and coach
 G. A. Frank Knight (1869–1937), Scottish author and Bible scholar

See also  
 Francis Knight (disambiguation)